Charles Groves (13 January 1896 — 14 December 1969) was a Scottish first-class cricketer.

Groves was born at Leith in December 1896 and was educated in Edinburgh at George Heriot's School. He served in the First World War, enlisting as a private in the 5th Royal Scots. He gained the commissioned rank of second lieutenant in November 1916, with promotion to lieutenant following in April 1918. He saw action during the war on the Western Front and the Gallipoli campaign. A club cricketer for Heriot's Former Pupils, he made his debut for Scotland in first-class cricket against Surrey at Glasgow in 1923. He made three further first-class appearances for Scotland, against Wales in 1924, Lancashire in 1925, and Ireland in 1928. Playing as an all-rounder in the Scottish side, Groves scored 150 runs in his four matches at an average of 18.75; he made one half century score of 64. With his right-arm medium pace bowling, he took 9 wickets at a bowling average of 31.55, with best figures of 3 for 83. Groves died in December 1969 in England at Danby, Yorkshire.

References

External links
 

1896 births
1969 deaths
People from Leith
People educated at George Heriot's School
British Army personnel of World War I
Royal Scots soldiers
Royal Scots officers
Scottish cricketers
Military personnel from Edinburgh